Karol Lipiński Academy of Music (pol. Akademia Muzyczna im. Karola Lipińskiego we Wrocławiu) is a university level school of music in Wrocław, Poland.

Departments
Department of Composition, Conducting, Theory of Music and Music Therapy
Instrumental Department provides classes in: 
keyboard instruments (piano, harpsichord, organ, and accordion), 
string instruments (violin, viola, cello, viola da gamba, contrabass), 
woodwind instruments (flute, recorder, western concert flute, oboe, baroque oboe, clarinet, saxophone, bassoon), 
brass instruments (trumpet, horn, trombone, tuba), 
percussion instruments, 
guitar
jazz instruments (piano, clarinet, saxophone, trump, trombone, contrabass and percussion).
Vocal Department educates singers in vocal acting and song-oratorio.
Music Education Department has a string orchestra and two coeducational choirs: "Feichtinum" and "The Stanislaw Krukowski Choir".

See also
Karol Lipiński

External links 
Academy site

Music schools in Poland